The Complaint of the Black Knight is a poem by the English monk John Lydgate.

One edition is the oldest surviving book printed in Scotland that displays the printing date: 4 April 1508 (see 1508 in poetry). In 2010 it was chosen by UNESCO to become part of its Memory of the World Register. Printed in Edinburgh by Chepman and Myllar, the book was often falsely attributed in Scotland as a work of Geoffrey Chaucer.

See also
 The Flyting of Dumbar and Kennedie
 Global spread of the printing press

References

External links
 page by page scan with transcription at the National Library of Scotland website

1508 books
16th century in Scotland
History of Edinburgh
History of printing
Memory of the World Register
16th-century Scottish literature